NIIP may refer to:

 Net international investment position 
 NII Priborostroyeniya (V.V.Tikhomirov Scientific Research Institute of Instrument Design): Russian institute
 Vega Radio Engineering Corporation was known as MNIIP (Moscow NIIP)
 Navajo Indian Irrigation Project